Taurus was an  broad gauge locomotive operated by the South Devon Railway.

It was a very different locomotive to all the other s used on the South Devon Railway. It was much smaller and was normally used on one of the branches, where it would regularly work passenger trains, or on the dockside lines in the Plymouth area. It was built by the Avonside Engine Company and was a saddle tank similar to 2-4-0 Prince.

On 1 February 1876 the South Devon Railway was amalgamated with the Great Western Railway, all its locomotives were given numbers by their new owners but continued to carry their names too. After the gauge conversion on 21 May 1892 Taurus was unused for a while but in 1894 it was converted to standard gauge and worked in this form as no. 1326 until 1905.

Locomotive
 Taurus (1869 – 1892) GWR no. 2170 
The name comes from the Greek word for bull and represents a constellation. See Taurus (constellation).

References
 
 
 
 
 Railway company records at The National Archives

South Devon Railway Taurus
0-6-0ST locomotives
Taurus
Avonside locomotives
Individual locomotives of Great Britain
Railway locomotives introduced in 1869